Stean Pienaar (born 13 May 1997) is a South African rugby union player for the  in the Currie Cup and the  in the Rugby Challenge. He is a utility back that can play at centre, wing or scrum-half.

References

South African rugby union players
Living people
1997 births
Rugby union centres
Rugby union wings
Golden Lions players
Doping cases in rugby union
Lions (United Rugby Championship) players